Sirous Ghayeghran (22 January 1962 – 7 April 1998) was an Iranian footballer and former captain of Iran national football team.

Playing career

Club career
He played most of his club career for Malavan FC. In 1990, he signed for Ai-Ittihad of Qatar. He did not forget his roots and soon returned to Malavan, helping the club win the Hazfi Cup and participate in the Asian Club Championship. In 1993, he moved to the big spending team of the time Keshavarz FC, where he was also a coach. The team obtained respectable results but Ghayeghran moved to second division team Masoud Hormozgan where he coached once again. In 1997 and 1998 Ghayeghran stated numerous times that he would like to be involved with Malavan again, either as a coach or player.

International career
In February 1986 he made his debut for the national team against Pakistan. In 1987 Ghayeghran became the national team captain, after most of the already established national team members who had participated in the Asian tournaments from 1984 to 1986 resigned from playing (these included top stars such as Nasser Mohammadkhani, Hamid Alidoosti, Shahrokh Bayani, etc.) In 1988 thanks to Ghayeghran's leadership an underprepared and inexperienced Iran side finished third in the Asian Cup tournament. He and Mehdi Fonoonizadeh came out as the two players with their trademark long-range shots, which usually compensated for Iran's shortage in the area of teamwork. Two years later the team became the 1990 Asian Games champions, where Ghayeghran scored one of the most memorable goals in Iranian football history against South Korea.

He finished his international career with 43 caps and 6 goals.

Career statistics

International goals

Death
On 7 April 1998 as Ghayeghran and some family members were driving towards Tehran during a holiday in Norouz, they collided with a truck, leaving Ghayeghran and his son dead.

Honors

Club 
Malavan
Hazfi Cup: 1986, 1990
Runner-up: 1987

National 
Iran
Asian Games: 1990
Third place: 1988

Individual 
 Asian Cup Team of the Tournament: 1988

References

External links
 
 Ghayeghran Biography 
 Ghayeghran Official Weblog 
 Sirous Ghayeghran at TeamMelli.com

 

Iranian footballers
Iran international footballers
Association football midfielders
Malavan players
Iranian expatriate footballers
People from Bandar-e Anzali
Road incident deaths in Iran
1962 births
1998 deaths
Al-Gharafa SC players
Keshavarz players
Asian Games gold medalists for Iran
1988 AFC Asian Cup players
1992 AFC Asian Cup players
Sportspeople from Gilan province
Asian Games medalists in football
Footballers at the 1986 Asian Games
Footballers at the 1990 Asian Games
Qatar Stars League players
Medalists at the 1990 Asian Games
20th-century Iranian people